Kenny Garrett (born October 9, 1960) is an American post-bop jazz musician and composer who gained recognition in his youth as a member of the Duke Ellington Orchestra and for his time with Miles Davis's band. His primary instruments are alto and soprano saxophone and flute. Since 1985, he has pursued a solo career.

Biography
Kenny Garrett was born in Detroit, Michigan, on October 9, 1960. His father was a carpenter who played tenor saxophone as a hobby. Garrett's own career as a saxophonist took off when he joined the Duke Ellington Orchestra, under the leadership of Mercer Ellington, in 1978. Garrett also played and recorded with Art Blakey, Miles Davis, Freddie Hubbard, and Woody Shaw before developing his career as a leader.

In 1984, Garrett recorded his first album as a bandleader, Introducing Kenny Garrett, on the CrissCross label. In the year, he became the founding member of Out of the Blue which was produced by Blue Note Records.
In 1986, Garrett became a member of Art Blakey's Jazz Messengers.

He signed to the Warner Bros. Records label, and beginning with Black Hope, in 1992, he recorded eight albums for them. Garrett's music sometimes exhibits Asian influences, an aspect which is especially prevalent in his 2006 Grammy-nominated recording Beyond the Wall.

Garrett joined the "Five Peace Band" of Chick Corea, John McLaughlin, Christian McBride and Brian Blade/Vinnie Colaiuta around 2008. The CD Five Peace Band – Live won a Grammy Award in 2010.

In 2011, Garrett was presented with an Honorary Doctorate in Music from Berklee College of Music, Boston, Massachusetts. Garrett also was the Commencement Speaker for graduates.

In 2012, Garrett received a Soul Train Award nomination for his 2012 studio album Seeds from the Underground in the Best Traditional Jazz Artist/Group category. Also in 2012, Grammy nominations for Seeds from the Underground followed in the Best Jazz Instrumental Album and Best Improvised Jazz Solo categories, and Seeds From The Underground received a NAACP Image Award nomination in the Outstanding Jazz Album category. In 2013, Garrett won an Echo Award in the Saxophonist of the Year category.

Garrett's Pushing the World Away album received a Grammy nomination in the Best Jazz Instrumental Album category in 2013.

Garrett has been a resident of Glen Ridge, New Jersey.

Honors
 2011: Honorary Doctorate of Music from Berklee College of Music, Commencement Speaker.
 2023: NEA Jazz Masters Fellowship

Influence
Garrett was described as "The most important alto saxophonist of his generation" by the Washington City Paper and "One of the most admired alto saxophonists in jazz after Charlie Parker" by The New York Times.

Discography

As leader/co-leader 
 Introducing Kenny Garrett (Criss Cross, 1985) - rec. 1984
 Garrett 5 (Paddle Wheel, 1989) - rec. 1988
 Prisoner of Love (Atlantic, 1989)
 African Exchange Student (Atlantic, 1990)
 Black Hope (Warner Bros., 1992)

 Triology (Warner Bros., 1995)
 Pursuance: The Music of John Coltrane (Warner Bros., 1996)
 Songbook (Warner Bros., 1997)
 Simply Said (Warner Bros., 1999)
 Happy People (Warner Bros., 2002)
 Standard of Language (Warner Bros., 2003)
 Beyond the Wall (Nonesuch, 2006)
 Sketches of MD: Live at the Iridium (Mack Avenue, 2008) – live
 Seeds from the Underground (Mack Avenue, 2012)
 Pushing the World Away (Mack Avenue, 2013)
 Do Your Dance! (Mack Avenue, 2016)
 Sounds from the Ancestors (Mack Avenue, 2021)

Compilations 
 Old Folks (West Wind, 1999) with John Scofield, Michael Brecker and David Friesen
 Casino Lights '99 (Warner Bros., 2000) – live at Montreux Jazz Festival
 V.A., Relief: A Benefit for the Jazz Foundation of America's Musicians' Emergency Fund (Mack Avenue, 2021)

As a member 
Out of the Blue
 Out of the Blue (Blue Note, 1985) with Michael Philip Mossman, Ralph Bowen, Harry Pickens, Robert Hurst and Ralph Peterson, Jr.
 Inside Track (Blue Note, 1986) with the same musicians
 Live at Mt. Fuji (Blue Note, 1987) with Michael Philip, Mossman Ralph Bowen, Harry Pickens, Ralph Peterson, Jr. and Kenny Davis – live recorded in Mount Fuji Jazz Festival 1986 at Lake Yamanaka

Manhattan projects
 Dreamboat (Timeless, 1990) with Roy Hargrove, Donald Brown, Ira Coleman, Carl Allen – recorded in 1989

General Music Project (G. M. Project)
Co-leader with Charnett Moffett
 General Music Project (Evidence, 1997) with Charles Moffett and Geri Allen
 Blacker (Sweet Basil, 1997) with Charles Moffett and Cyrus Chestnut
 General Music Project II (Evidence, 1998) with the same musicians
 Mr. J.P. (VideoArts, 2001) with Louis Hayes and Carlos McKinney

As sideman 

With Donald Byrd
 1987: Harlem Blues (Landmark, 1988)
 1989: Getting Down to Business (Landmark, 1990)

With Chick Corea
 Remembering Bud Powell (Stretch, 1997) – Grammy nominated
 Five Peace Band Live with John McLaughlin (Concord, 2009)[2CD] – Grammy won
 The Musician (Concord Jazz, 2017)[3CD]

With Miles Davis
 1988-89: Amandla (Warner Bros., 1989)
 1990: Dingo (Warner Bros., 1991)
 1988–91: Live Around the World (Warner Bros., 1996) – live
 1991: Miles & Quincy Live at Montreux (Warner Bros., 1993) – live
 1991: Merci Miles! Live at Vienne (Warner, 2021) – live

With Roy Haynes
 Praise (Dreyfus Jazz, 1998)
 Birds of a Feather: A Tribute to Charlie Parker (Dreyfus Jazz, 2001) – Grammy nominated

With Freddie Hubbard
 Double Take with Woody Shaw (Blue Note, 1985)
 The Eternal Triangle with Woody Shaw (Blue Note, 1987)
 Topsy – Standard Book (alfa, 1990) – rec. 1989

With Marcus Miller
 The Sun Don't Lie (Dreyfus, 1993)
 Tales (Dreyfus, 1995)
 Live & More (GRP, 1997)
 M² (Telarc, 2001)
 Dreyfus Night in Paris with Michel Petrucciani, Biréli Lagrène, Lenny White (Dreyfus Jazz, 2003) – live rec. 1994

With Mulgrew Miller
 Wingspan (Landmark, 1987)
 Hand in Hand (Novus, 1993) – rec. 1992

With Charnett Moffett
 Beauty Within (Blue Note, 1989)
 Evidence (Telarc, 1993)

With Woody Shaw
 Double Take with Freddie Hubbard (Blue Note, 1985)
 The Eternal Triangle with Freddie Hubbard (Blue Note, 1987)

With Mike Stern
 These Times (ESC, 2004)
 All Over the Place (Heads Up International, 2012) – rec. 2011

With Jeff "Tain" Watts
 Citizen Tain (Columbia, 1999)
 Detained at The Blue Note (Half Note, 2004) – live

With others
 Geri Allen, The Nurturer (Blue Note, 1991) – rec. 1990
 Clifton Anderson, Decade (Doxy, 2008)
 Art Blakey and The Jazz Messengers, Feeling Good (Delos Productions, 1986)
 Cindy Blackman, Arcane (Muse, 1987) – rec. 1986
 Terence Blanchard, Romantic Defiance (Columbia, 1995) – rec. 1994
 Richard Bona, "Painting a Whish" in Munia: The Tale (Verve, 2003)
 Cameo, Machismo (Atlanta Artists, 1988) – rec. 1987-88
 Dennis Chambers, Planet Earth (BHM Productions, 2005)
 The Duke Ellington Orchestra, Music is my Mistress (Musicmasters, 1989)
 Foley, 7 Years Ago ... Directions In Smart-Alec Music (MoJazz, 1993)
 Guru, Guru's Jazzmatazz, Vol. 2: The New Reality (Chrysalis, 1995)
 Bobby Hutcherson, Skyline (Verve, 1999)
 Javon Jackson, When The Time Is Right (Blue Note, 1994) - rec. 1993
 Al Jarreau, Tenderness (Reprise, 1994) - rec. 1993
 Rodney Kendrick, The Secrets of Rodney Kendrick (Verve, 1993)
 Christian McBride, Number Two Express (verve, 1996) - rec. 1995
 John McLaughlin, Five Peace Band Live (Concord, 2009) – Grammy won
 Meshell Ndegeocello, The Spirit Music Jamia: Dance of the Infidel (Universal Music, 2005)
 Michel Petrucciani, Dreyfus Night in Paris with Marcus Miller, Biréli Lagrène, Lenny White (Dreyfus Jazz, 2003) – live rec. 1994
 Q-Tip, Kamaal the Abstract (Battery, 2009) – rec. 2001
 Tony Reedus & Urban Relations, People Get Ready (Sweet Basil, 1998)
 Wallace Roney, Intuition (Muse, 1988)
 Philippe Saisse, Masques (Verve Forecast, 1995)
 John Scofield, Works for Me (Verve, 2001) - rec. 2000
 Woody Shaw, Solid (Muse, 1987) – rec. 1986
 Patches Stewart, Blow (Koch, 2005)
 Stephen Scott, The Beautiful Thing (Verve, 1997)
 Sting, "The Burning Babe" in If on a Winter's Night... (Deutsche Grammophon, 2009)
 Wayman Tisdale, Power Forward (Motown, 1995)
 Steve Turre, Rainbow People (HighNote, 2008)
 Jack Walrath, Master of Suspense (Blue Note, 1987) – rec. 1986-87
 Cedar Walton, Cedar Walton Plays (Delos, 1986) – rec. 1986
 Lenny White, Present Tense (Hip Bop, 1995)
 Larry Willis, My Funny Valentine (Jazz City, 1988)
 Akiko Yano, "" in Elephant Hotel (Epic, 1994)

Publications

Awards and nominations

Chart positions

References

External links
 
Official Site
Mack Avenue Artist Page

1960 births
Living people
Post-bop jazz musicians
American jazz composers
American male jazz composers
American jazz flautists
American jazz saxophonists
American male saxophonists
Jazz alto saxophonists
Miles Davis
Musicians from Detroit
Musicians from New Jersey
African-American jazz musicians
People from Glen Ridge, New Jersey
21st-century saxophonists
Jazz musicians from Michigan
Out of the Blue (American band) members
Mack Avenue Records artists
Warner Records artists
Criss Cross Jazz artists
21st-century flautists
Atlantic Records artists
Nonesuch Records artists
Bellaphon Records artists